Live at the Whisky a Go Go is a live album by flautist Herbie Mann recorded in 1969 and released on the Atlantic label.

Reception

The Allmusic site awarded the album 4 stars calling it "one of Herbie Mann's better sets of the era".

Track listing 
 "Ooh Baby" (Chris Hills, Columbus Baker) - 15:05
 "Philly Dog" (Rufus Thomas) - 14:04

Personnel 
Herbie Mann - flute
Steve Marcus - tenor saxophone
Roy Ayers - vibraphone
Sonny Sharrock - guitar
Miroslav Vitouš - bass
Bruno Carr - drums
Technical
Bill Halverson - recording engineer
Larry Browne - photography

References 

Herbie Mann live albums
1969 live albums
Albums produced by Nesuhi Ertegun
Atlantic Records live albums
Albums recorded at the Whisky a Go Go